The Okaloacoochee Slough State Forest is in the U.S. state of Florida. The  forest is located in the southwestern part of the state, near Felda.  The forest gets its name from the Muskogee and when translated may mean "small bad water" or "boggy slaw."

See also
List of Florida state forests
List of Florida state parks

References

External links
 Florida Department of Agriculture and Consumer Services, "Florida Forest Service: Okaloacoochee Slough State Forest", 2004.

Florida state forests
Protected areas of Collier County, Florida
Protected areas of Hendry County, Florida